Paavo Lukander (born 26 March 1961) is a Finnish former rally co-driver. Lukander worked as a map reader for Toni Gardemeister, with whom he remained active throughout his career. At the 1999 Ulster Rally, Lukander was injured when their car veered off the road.

References

External links

Profile at ewrc-results.com

1961 births
Finnish rally co-drivers
Living people
World Rally Championship co-drivers